Francis Field is a 2,000-seat football field in Greenville, Illinois. It is home to the Greenville College Panthers football team.  The facility opened in 1987.

Francis Field has three times been the location of the National Christian College Athletic Association Victory Bowl, in 2009, in 2012, and in 2019.

References

External links
 Francis Field

College football venues
American football venues in Illinois
Athletics (track and field) venues in Illinois
Buildings and structures in Bond County, Illinois